Lygophis lineatus, the lined ground snake, is a species of snake in the family Colubridae.  The species is native to Panama, Colombia, Venezuela, Guyana, Suriname, French Guiana, Brazil, Argentina, Bolivia, and Ecuador.

References

Lygophis
Snakes of Central America
Snakes of South America
Reptiles of Brazil
Reptiles of Panama
Reptiles of Colombia
Reptiles of Argentina
Reptiles described in 1758
Taxa named by Carl Linnaeus